David Coleman Headley (born Daood Sayed Gilani; June 30, 1960) is an American terrorist. He is currently serving a 35-year sentence in the United States after pleading guilty to 12 international terrorism charges.

It has been alleged that Headley made periodic trips to Pakistan for Lashkar-e-Taiba training while simultaneously working as an informant for the U.S. Drug Enforcement Administration (DEA), but this is disputed.
Under the direction of Lashkar chiefs, Headley performed five spying missions in Mumbai to scout targets for the attacks, which killed 168 people. The following year, he performed a similar mission in Copenhagen to help plan an attack against the Danish newspaper Jyllands-Posten, which had published cartoons of Muhammad. He was arrested at O'Hare International Airport in Chicago while on his way to Pakistan in October 2009.

U.S. authorities gave Indian investigators direct access to Headley,
but some in India have questioned why the U.S. had not shared suspicions about him with Indian authorities before the Mumbai attacks.
At the trial of Tahawwur Hussain Rana, an alleged co-conspirator, Headley gave detailed information about the participation of Pakistan's Directorate of Inter-Services Intelligence (ISI) in carrying out the attacks. 
Since his arrest and guilty plea, Headley has cooperated with U.S. and Indian authorities and given information about his associates. On January 24, 2013, a U.S. federal court sentenced Headley to 35 years in prison for his role in the Mumbai attacks.

Headley was prosecuted by a Mumbai special court in early February 2016, via a video link from his prison cell in the United States. He was prosecuted by special public prosecutor Ujjwal Nikam, the same lawyer who represented the state during the Mumbai attack trials.

Early life
David Coleman Headley was born as Daood Sayed Gilani in Washington, D.C., to Sayed Salim Gilani (?–2008) and Alice Serrill Headley (1939–2008). Sayed Gilani was a well-known Pakistani diplomat and broadcaster. Serrill Headley, originally from Bryn Mawr, Pennsylvania and a prominent figure in Philadelphia high society, worked as a secretary at the Pakistani embassy in Washington. Daood Gilani has a younger sister, Syedah, and a half-brother, Danyal. As an adult, Danyal Gilani became the spokesman for Pakistani Prime Minister Yousaf Raza Gillani and presently serves as Pakistan's press attaché in Beijing.

In 1960, shortly after Gilani was born, his family left the United States and settled in Lahore, the capital of the Pakistani province of Punjab. There, Gilani stood out because of his light skin color—he was often called a gora, meaning "fair", predominantly used for Americans and Europeans—and because of the heterochromic coloration of his eyes. Gilani's mother was unable to adapt to Pakistani culture and returned to the U.S. Because of Pakistani custody rules, she was forced to leave her children with their father in Lahore. After getting a divorce, she went through four more marriages and spent time in Southeast Asia and Afghanistan.

Daood Gilani was raised in a political environment steeped in Pakistani nationalism and Islamic conservatism, both of which were amplified by Pakistani tensions with India. During the Indo-Pakistani War of 1971, stray bombs hit Gilani's elementary school in Karachi and killed two people; this event, along with Pakistan's defeat at the war's conclusion, is thought to have stoked Gilani's animus towards India. Gilani went on to attend the elite Cadet College Hasan Abdal, a boys' military prep school. Gilani remained in contact with classmates, and later engaged in impassioned debates with them about politics and Islam in e-mail correspondence.

In 1977, at the age of seventeen, Gilani left a contentious relationship with his Pakistani stepmother and moved to the U.S. with the help of his biological mother, Serrill Headley. Gilani settled with his mother in Philadelphia, where he helped her manage the Khyber Pass Pub and the adjacent Miss Headley's Wine Bar. Employees at the pub nicknamed him "The Prince." Gilani enrolled at a military high school, Valley Forge Military Academy, but dropped out after one semester. He was a student at the Community College of Philadelphia but dropped out without a degree in the 1990s. In 1985, he married a Pennsylvania State University student, but they divorced two years later due to cultural differences. He eventually moved to New York City and opened a video rental business.

Drug convictions and DEA deal
During his frequent trips to Pakistan, Gilani hung out with heroin users and started using the drug himself. He became involved in Pakistani drug trafficking. When he was twenty-four, Gilani smuggled half a kilogram of heroin out of Pakistani tribal areas and used Tahawwur Hussain Rana, a Pakistani army doctor who Gilani knew from military school, as an unwitting shield. Several days later, police in Lahore arrested Gilani for drug possession, but he somehow managed to beat the charges. Rana continued to be used by Gilani over the course of his career as a drug trafficker; in the late 1990s, after Rana had emigrated to the U.S., Gilani used Rana's legitimate immigration consulting company in Chicago to smuggle drugs.

In 1988, while he was traveling to Philadelphia from Pakistan, Gilani was arrested by police in Frankfurt, West Germany after two kilos of heroin were found hidden in a false bottom in his suitcase. Gilani quickly made a plea deal when his case was handed over to the U.S. Drug Enforcement Administration, agreeing to surrender his partners in Philadelphia in exchange for a lighter sentence. Gilani's cooperation earned him four years in prison while his two associates were sentenced to eight and ten years. At his sentencing hearing, the judge made the following statement: "It's up to you, Mr. Gilani, to do what you can with the rest of your life. You are still a young man. You can either take advantage of this opportunity. Your mother, your lawyer, people said some nice things about you, but what you did, not only to yourself, but to perhaps thousands, hundreds of victims, heroin users in this country is a terrible thing."

Gilani managed to overcome his addiction to heroin, but was still involved in the drug trade. In early 1997, Gilani was arrested with another man in a DEA sting operation when he tried to smuggle heroin into the country from Pakistan. Gilani quickly offered his services as a confidential informant to the DEA. In January 1998, the agency sent him to Pakistan to dispel suspicions amongst his partners about his prior absence, and to gain intelligence on the country's heroin trafficking networks. According to the DEA, Gilani's participation led to five arrests and the seizure of 2½ kilos of heroin. The DEA has insisted that Gilani's 1998 trip to Pakistan was the only one paid for by the agency.

While the DEA seemingly made great gains from Gilani's intelligence, there is ample evidence that Gilani abused his status as an informant. He allegedly tried to set up heroin dealers with jailhouse phone calls that were not monitored by DEA agents. A mentally impaired Pakistani immigrant, Ikram Haq, was found to have been tricked into making a drug deal by Gilani, and was subsequently acquitted on the grounds of entrapment when brought to trial. Despite this result, Gilani was released from prison and put on probation for his contribution to the case. One anonymous former associate of Gilani later suggested that he was exploiting his rapport with the DEA, saying, "The DEA agents liked him. He would brag about it. He was manipulating them. He said he had them in his pocket."

Involvement in terrorism
In exchange for information about Pakistani drug contacts, Gilani received a considerably lighter sentence than his co-defendant from the 1997 arrest: fifteen months in jail and five years of supervised release. In November 1998, he was delivered to the low-security Federal Correctional Institution, Fort Dix. There, he became an increasingly devout Muslim. In July 1999, only months into Gilani's sentence, his attorney, Howard Leader, requested permission for him to be given a supervised early release from prison so he could travel to Pakistan to be wed in an arranged marriage. Judge Carol Amon granted the unusual request. Gilani married a Pakistani woman named Shazia and fathered two children with her.

While visiting Lahore, Gilani was introduced to Lashkar-e-Taiba (LeT), a terrorist organization. Gilani made further trips to Pakistan without the knowledge of U.S. authorities, immersing himself in LeT ideology. He befriended LeT's spiritual leader, Hafiz Muhammad Saeed, and committed himself to the group's struggle against India, which was supported by the Directorate for Inter-Services Intelligence (ISI), Pakistan's premier intelligence service.

At the same time this was happening, Gilani resumed work as a DEA informant in New York City and participated in an undercover operation that reportedly led to the seizure of one kilo of heroin. Yet despite working for a U.S. government agency, Gilani actively raised money and recruited new members for LeT, a group that swore allegiance with al-Qaeda. Gilani would later testify that he discussed his views regarding Kashmir—the focus of LeT's militant activities—with his DEA handlers. The DEA has insisted that it was unaware of Gilani's political and religious radicalization.

Post-9/11 activities
One day after the attacks on September 11, 2001, Gilani's DEA handlers tasked him with collecting counter-intelligence on terrorists through his sources in the drug trade. However, a New York City bartender named Terry O'Donnell reported Gilani to an FBI task force after Gilani's ex-girlfriend told him that Gilani had praised the 9/11 hijackers and "got off on watching the news over and over again" in the weeks following the attacks. Under questioning by two Defense Department agents, in the presence of his DEA handlers, Gilani denied the accusations and cited his work for the DEA as proof of his loyalty to the U.S. Gilani was cleared, and the DEA did not write a report on his interrogation.

On November 16, 2001, six weeks after his interrogation, Leader and Assistant U.S. Attorney Loan Hong made a joint application to Judge Amon asking for Gilani's supervised release to be terminated three years early. Amon agreed to their request and discharged Gilani from any further probation. Leader has claimed that the DEA was involved in the drive to end Gilani's probation, which would have kept him from traveling to Pakistan to continue his intelligence work on terrorists. However, the DEA has claimed that Gilani wanted his probation lifted so he could travel to Pakistan for family reasons. DEA officials also claim that the agency officially deactivated Gilani as an informant on March 27, 2002. Headley himself has claimed that he ended his work for the DEA in September 2002; other agencies claim that he remained a DEA operative as late as 2005.

In February 2002, Gilani went to a LeT training camp and did a three-week introductory course on LeT ideology and jihad. That summer, Serrill Headley, who by then had moved to the town of Oxford, Pennsylvania with her brother, confided to friends that her son had become a religious fanatic and had been to terrorist training camps. While Gilani was on a catering visit to his mother's house, one of her friends, Phyllis Keith, noticed that he parked his car behind her residence as if he was trying to hide it. Keith reported Gilani to the FBI office in Philadelphia, which apparently did not follow through with an investigation.

That August, Gilani returned to Pakistan and began a second stint at the LeT training camp; he spent his spare time with Shazia in Lahore. Despite being already married in Pakistan, Gilani embarked on a series of affairs in the U.S. and had become engaged to a long-time girlfriend in New York City the month before. In December 2002, after landing in New York City, Gilani was briefly detained by border inspectors who had been on the lookout for unusual travel patterns to hubs of terrorism such as Pakistan. However, the border inspectors found nothing amiss and soon released him. Gilani married his fiancée at a Jamaican resort a few days later.

In the summer of 2005, Gilani's second wife confronted him after learning about his other marriage, and about his trips to the LeT training camps, from his father. On August 25, 2005, Gilani hit his wife during an argument at his New York video store. After having Gilani arrested for assault, his wife called a government hotline and disclosed his terrorist activities. She was subsequently interviewed three times by the FBI's Joint Terrorism Task Force. The FBI, citing Gilani's work for the DEA, did not consider him a threat despite the accusations leveled against him in 2001 and 2002. The FBI agent investigating the matter speculated that Gilani's wife made her accusations because she had "an axe to grind" regarding his other marriage. Gilani was never questioned, and the assault charge was eventually dropped. Gilani later closed his video store.

In June 2006, Gilani's second wife, originally from Canada, applied for a green card under a U.S. law for abused spouses. In addition to physical abuse, Gilani's wife made reference to his radicalization and terrorist training; his anti-Semitic and anti-Hindu prejudices; and his praise for suicide bombers. U.S. immigration services granted the green card, but did not alert law enforcement about Gilani because of strict privacy laws governing immigration cases which involve spousal abuse.

Mumbai plot

Name change and ISI recruitment
By 2005, Gilani's training had advanced to the point where he wanted to fight in Kashmir. Instead, Gilani was referred to Sajid Mir, LeT's foreign recruiter. Under Mir's direction, Gilani went to Philadelphia and legally changed his name to David Coleman Headley, taking his mother's surname. Even though Pennsylvania law requires a background check for name changes, state officials apparently did not uncover Headley's previous drug convictions. The name change would make it easier for Headley to hide his Pakistani ancestry and pass as a Westerner, leading anyone he encountered to assume he was a tourist.

In January 2006, Headley established ties with Adbur Rehman Hashim "Pasha" Syed, a retired Pakistan Army major and LeT militant, who put him in touch with Major Iqbal, a mysterious figure who is believed to have coordinated LeT activity through his capacity as an ISI officer. Under sworn testimony, Headley recalled meeting Iqbal and his superior, a Pakistani colonel, in a safe house. Iqbal and Mir reportedly became Headley's ISI handlers and oversaw his training in espionage techniques in preparation for a reconnaissance mission to Mumbai; he met with Iqbal and Mir separately so that the ISI could maintain plausible deniability. In February, Headley was again detained by border inspectors at John F. Kennedy International Airport after returning from Pakistan, and was again released. That month, he contacted his former DEA handler for the final time.

In 2007, Headley met a Moroccan medical student in Lahore named Faiza Outalha, eventually marrying her as his third wife; unlike his second wife, Outalha reportedly knew that Headley was already married and approved of the potential arrangement. However, their relationship was strained due to Outalha's progressive views and Headley's unflinching religious conservatism. One reported point of contention was Headley's demand that Outalha wear traditional Muslim clothing for women. In December 2007, Outalha filed assault charges against Headley after getting into an altercation with his servant outside of their house in Lahore. After spending eight days in jail, Headley was reportedly released after Iqbal intervened.

Trips to Mumbai
Over the course of 2007, LeT's plot for the Mumbai attacks started to materialize, and the Western-looking Headley was considered the ideal militant to perform reconnaissance missions. Using $25,000 supplied to him by Iqbal, Headley opened a Mumbai branch office for Tahawwur Rana's immigration business—which Headley had already used to traffic heroin—as a front company. Between 2007 and 2008, Headley made five trips to Mumbai, scouting local landmarks where LeT terrorists would carry out the multi-pronged attack. Headley stayed at the Taj Palace Hotel—identified by Iqbal and Mir as their main target—and surveyed the building using his ISI training, shooting hours of video during in-house tours.

Iqbal and Mir were emboldened by Headley's intelligence and decided to make their attack more ambitious in scale. As they expanded their list of targets, Headley scouted the Oberoi Trident Hotel, the Leopold Cafe, and the Chhatrapati Shivaji Terminus. When LeT decided to target the Nariman House, a Jewish community center, Headley visited the location posing as a Jew. Headley also took boat tours to look for places where the attackers could reach the city through the waterfront; he found a landing location at a fishermen's slum in the Colaba area of southern Mumbai, where he gathered GPS coordinates. For the maritime reconnaissance, Headley received assistance from a frogman in the Pakistan Navy.

Headley lived the high life during his time in Mumbai, and developed a rapport with the very people he was planning to help attack. He joined an upscale gym, frequented nightclubs, and befriended Rahul Bhatt, the son of Bollywood director Mahesh Bhatt, who guided him through the city's party scene. During his stay at the Taj Hotel, Headley acquainted himself with the hotel's staff, reportedly praising the building's architecture. In Colaba, he reportedly tried to attract a young café proprietor.

For their 2007 honeymoon, Headley took Outalha with him to Mumbai and stayed at both the Taj Hotel and the Oberoi Trident. The trip ended with an argument between the couple and Outalha was sent back to Lahore. Afterwards, Iqbal and Mir pressured Headley to divorce Outalha, believing she endangered his cover. She responded by reporting Headley to the U.S. embassy in Islamabad, and later submitting to interviews with State Department and ICE officials, describing his Mumbai activities at length. However, Outalha later admitted that she embellished some of her accusations against Headley, leading the Americans to not take her claims seriously. The State Department relayed her warnings to the DEA, the FBI, and the CIA, but whether the agencies acted on them is disputed. After leaving Pakistan, Outalha divorced from Headley.

As the attacks unfolded in late November 2008, Headley watched the news coverage at home in Lahore after receiving a text message. The ten LeT militants carried out the attacks per the detailed intelligence gathered by Headley during his trips; the attack would lead to the deaths of 168 people, including six Americans. The intelligence he collected on the Nariman House allowed the terrorists to raid the building and execute its staff, in an act personally supervised by Mir from a command post in Karachi. Shazia, who had moved with her children to Chicago earlier in 2008 and knew of Headley's reconnaissance work for LeT, praised him in a coded e-mail: "Congrats on your graduation. Graduation ceremony is really great. Watched the movie the whole day."

Denmark plot

First visit and Kashmiri allegiance
In October 2008, one month before the Mumbai attacks, Mir and Iqbal assigned Headley to scout the Jyllands-Posten newspaper in Copenhagen, which they wanted to attack in retribution for its publication of cartoons of Muhammad. Headley visited the editorial offices of Jyllands-Posten in January 2009, claiming to be interested in buying ad space. After meeting with the paper's advertising executive, Headley drove to Jyllands-Posten'''s newspaper building in Aarhus and met another executive there. Elsewhere during his trip, Headley collected video footage of Copenhagen, including the offices of Jyllands-Posten; looked into leasing an apartment that could be used by LeT's attack team; and inquired about getting a job as a secretary.

After being told by his LeT handlers that the plot would be put on hold, Headley became disenchanted with the group. Syed became Headley's new handler and introduced him to Ilyas Kashmiri, a former Pakistani military commandoIn congressional testimony, a Heritage Foundation analyst said that Ilyas Kashmiri was a former Pakistani SSG commando and is now the leader of the Harakat-ul-Jihad-i-Islami (HUJI). and leader of Harkat-ul-Jihad al-Islami, an Islamist organization active in Pakistan, India, and Bangladesh. Kashmiri took over sponsorship of the Denmark plot and made changes to the plan, using the Mumbai attacks as inspiration; he wanted terrorists to storm the Jyllands-Posten offices, have its staff be taken hostage and executed, and then have their severed heads thrown out of the windows of the newsroom in an international media spectacle.

Second visit
Headley planned to return to Copenhagen during the summer of 2009. Kashmiri put him in contact with two al-Qaeda operatives called Simon and Bash, who were living in Derby, England. However, when Headley visited Derby on July 26, 2009, Simon and Bash informed him that they did not want to participate in the Denmark plot and were unable to supply weapons, instead giving him US$15,000 in financing. Headley then traveled to Stockholm to meet a veteran militant named Farid. Farid, reportedly agitated, was also unable to help Headley as he was under tight surveillance by Swedish police. When Headley arrived in Copenhagen by train on July 31, he shot video of a Royal Danish Army barracks and approached drug dealers about acquiring guns.

Arrest and charges
Upon flying to Atlanta, Georgia on August 5, 2009, Headley was questioned by airport inspectors. By this point, the FBI had put Headley on a watch list and engaged in a two-month surveillance operation, debriefing Headley's former DEA handler and reviewing records of past inquiries. Eventually, investigators began to suspect Headley of being involved with the Mumbai attacks. On October 9, Headley was arrested at Chicago's O'Hare International Airport while he was attempting to travel to Pakistan to deliver the footage he collected in Denmark.

During his interrogation, Headley gave up information on LeT, al-Qaeda, the ISI, and various terror plots and methods. Supervised by federal agents, he helped set up a trap against a militant in Germany and attempted to lure Sajid Mir out of Pakistan. Despite this, Headley, along with Rana, was charged in his involvement with Kashmiri's plot against Jyllands-Posten. Headley was accused of traveling to Denmark to scout the Jyllands-Posten office and a nearby synagogue. The FBI later additionally charged Headley of conspiring to bomb targets in the Mumbai attacks and providing material support to LeT.

India's National Investigation Agency (NIA) registered a case against Headley and Rana for allegedly plotting the Mumbai attacks.  After questioning Headley in Chicago for a week, the NIA requested a Delhi court to issue non-bailable warrants to arrest Headley and other conspirators. Indian Home Minister Palaniappan Chidambaram reported that U.S. authorities shared "significant information" about the case. U.S. Assistant Secretary of State Robert O. Blake, Jr. promised that India would have "full access" to question Headley, although the possibility of extraditing him appeared to be precluded by Headley's plea agreement with U.S. Attorney Patrick Fitzgerald.
Chidambaram said they would continue to try to get the man extradited.

Headley's admissions, e.g., that he made video recordings of terrorism targets for the LeT, had corroborated other evidence in the trial of Ajmal Amir Kasab in Mumbai.

A classified Indian report, based on Headley's interrogation by Indian investigators in Chicago, concludes that some of Headley's scouting trips to Mumbai were financed and planned by the ISI. When this report was leaked to U.S. media in October 2010, its conclusions were denied by Pakistani authorities.

In March 2009, Headley made another trip to India to conduct surveillance of the National Defence College in Delhi, and of Chabad Houses in various cities in India.

Passport issues
Indian investigators were surprised at how easily Headley had obtained a visa to enter India, a process that is extremely difficult for Pakistani nationals and Pakistani-origin individuals.  Headley's U.S. passport, his new Western and English-sounding name, and the fact that the passport and his visa application made no mention of his prior name or his father's nationality, made it easy for him to obtain an Indian visa from the Indian consulate in Chicago.  He falsely stated on his visa application that his father's name was William Headley and that his own name at birth was "Headley", a claim that was difficult to refute since the U.S. passport, unlike the Indian one, does not provide the father's name, and does not require endorsements on name changes by the passport holder.
Indian government officials said that if the name change had been noted on his passport, Indian immigration officials would have been alerted during his multiple visits to India.

On his visits to India, Headley befriended several people, including Rahul Bhatt, the son of Mahesh Bhatt, a famous movie producer, who said he never suspected Headley of any wrongdoing.

Indian suspicion about U.S. relationship with Headley
While government officials in India cite full cooperation by U.S. authorities, the opposition parties and others in India have demanded explanations of why Headley was allowed to travel freely for years between India, Pakistan, and the U.S., and why he was working undercover for the DEA. Some Indian analysts have speculated that David Headley was a double agent for the Central Intelligence Agency that had infiltrated LeT, an accusation denied by the CIA. As soon as Headley was arrested in Chicago, the Indian media had a barrage of questions for the government about him, whose answers were slow in coming.
Among other questions, Indian investigators wanted the FBI to share its tapes of Headley's communications with his Pakistani handlers to match with the voices taped on cell phones during the 2008 Mumbai attacks.

Following intense coverage and speculation in the Indian press, U.S. ambassador Timothy J. Roemer in April 2010 told reporters in New Delhi that the United States was working at the "highest level" to provide India access to Headley, even as it was passing along answers to questions in "real time".

News reports in October 2010 revealed that U.S. authorities had much advance knowledge about Headley's terrorist associations and activities. Headley's American and Moroccan wives had contacted American authorities in 2005 and 2007, respectively, complaining about his terrorist activities. The Moroccan wife told reporters that she had even shown the U.S. embassy in Islamabad photographs of their stay at the Taj Mahal hotel in Mumbai, warning them that he was doing something on behalf of Lashkar-e-Taiba.

Since Headley's guilty plea, Home Minister P. Chidambaram was repeatedly asked why the U.S. cannot extradite Headley to India.  Analysts in some media outlets have speculated that the United States conspired to have Headley work undercover despite knowledge that he was involved in terrorism.A summary of attitudes in the Indian press toward the U.S. government's relationship with Headley, possible motives, and the players, as of March 2010.

NIA interrogation of Headley
In June 2010, US National Security Adviser James Jones announced that India's National Investigation Agency (NIA) had been given access to Headley. The investigation has confirmed that Lashkar-e-Taiba terrorists carried out the Mumbai attack under the "guidance" of Pakistan's Inter-Services Intelligence (ISI). Headley stated that the ISI was engaged with the Lashkar commanders responsible for the Mumbai deaths and injuries at each and every stage of the plot. Headley mentioned that Major Sameer Ali, Major Iqbal and Major Haroon Ashique, who are serving officers of the Pakistan Army, collaborated with the LeT.

Headley has also spoken of how after the Mumbai attacks, ISI wanted LeT to disown them in order to prevent global attention to the terror group. Pakistan considers it to be an important strategic asset to be used against India. With Ajmal Kasab as the only terrorist captured, ISI wanted to blame the terrorist act on al-Qaida. It prepared a list of 4-5 al-Qaida figures who were to be projected as the conspirators. The plan, however, did not work due to resistance from Lashkar leaders, particularly Zakiur Rehman Lakhvi.

Headley said that while he had started off as a Lashkar recruit, he started drifting towards al-Qaida under the influence of Major Abdul Rahman Saeed, who retired in 2002. Headley was respected by the retired major because of the data which he provided for the Mumbai attack.

Saeed, with the help of Ilyas Kashmiri, drafted Headley for the plan to attack the Danish newspaper Jylland Posten, which had published cartoons of Muhammad considered controversial by Muslims. Headley's original handler, Sajid Mir, wanted him to focus on Lashkar's anti-India mission.

Headley has claimed that Ishrat Jahan, thought to be a case of staged police "encounter killing", was a trained LeT suicide bomber. On May 31, 2011, however, Headley contradicted his previous statements, and testified that the Inter-Services Intelligence (ISI) leadership was not involved in planning the 2008 Mumbai attacks.

Pune attack claims
In relation to the 2010 Pune blast at the German bakery that injured at least 53 people and killed 18, of whom 6 were foreigners, Indian Home Secretary, G. K. Pillai and the Hindustan Times referred to Headley. The Hindustan Times stated that Headley had visited Pune in July 2008 and March 2009 and referred to him as a Lashkar-e-Taiba member. The Hindustan Times also reported that the CCTV footage which was accessed by the Investigating agency, could, per The Hindustan Times, help solve the mystery. The Times of India reported similar reports, along with The Telegraph, The Hindu, The Pioneer and also Indian Express. 

Review of U.S. handling of Headley
The United States Director of National Intelligence James R. Clapper conducted a review of slip-ups in handling Headley's involvement in the 26/11 Mumbai terror attacks.  His report was shared with India's Union Home Ministry.

Sentencing

On January 24, 2013, Headley, then 52 years old, was sentenced by U.S. District Judge Harry Leinenweber of the United States District Court for the Northern District of Illinois in Chicago to 35 years in prison for his part in the 2008 Mumbai attacks. Leinenweber called Headley a terrorist and said he hoped he would die in prison, telling him he deserved to be executed. "The sentence I impose, I'm hopeful it will keep Mr. Headley under lock and key for the rest of his natural life," Leinenweber said. "That's what you deserve. I don't have any faith in Mr. Headley when he says he's a changed person and believes in the American way of life." Headley could have been sentenced to life imprisonment, but federal prosecutors recommended a 35-year sentence in view of Headley's extensive cooperation with the government. Headley had provided details on the operations of the Pakistani terrorist group Lashkar-e-Taiba, which planned the Mumbai attacks, and information that he provided to the government led to charges against Tahawwur Hussain Rana and six other terrorist figures. Judge Leinenweber stated that the sentence was sufficient to put Headley "under lock and key for the rest of his life" so that he would "never [be] in a position again to commit a terrorist attack."

Others, including survivors of the attacks, have been critical of the sentence, saying that the length of the sentence was an "appalling dishonor" and that Headley has "no right to live."

Subsequent developments
The day after the sentence was imposed, the Indian government announced it would continue to seek Headley's extradition to India.

In April 2013, it was reported that while imprisoned, Headley had written a memoir detailing his involvement with Lashkar-e-Taiba and the Mumbai attacks.

In July 2015, it was reported that the Mumbai police were seeking to take a deposition of Headley by video conference to provide evidence against Zabiuddin Ansari (Abu Jundal).

On December 10, 2015, a Mumbai court pardoned Headley, making him an approver in the Mumbai case. Deposition started in Bombay High Court via video conference on February 8, 2016. He told the court that LeT made two unsuccessful attempts to carry out terror attacks before finally striking in November 2008, once in September and again in October.

On July 24, 2018, it was reported that Headley was seriously injured after being attacked in prison and admitted to the critical care unit of Evanston Hospital of the NorthShore University HealthSystem. Earlier, on February 9, 2016, it was reported that Headley had confessed to a Mumbai court about LeT and Inter-Services Intelligence having penetrated into the ranks of the Indian Army, to work for them as spies and an attack was also planned on the Indian defence scientists who were to meet at the conference hall in Taj Hotel, in Mumbai, in 2007. For this purpose he had carried out a recce on the Naval air station, INS Kunjali, INS Shikra and the Siddhivinayak Temple, Mumbai.

References

72 https://indianexpress.com/article/news-archive/web/headley-surveyed-german-bakery/

External links
A Perfect Terrorist from Frontline and ProPublica - originally aired November 22, 2011
American Terrorist from Frontline and ProPublica - originally aired April 21, 2015
The Case of David Headley: Pakistani American DEA Informant at Center of 2008 Mumbai Attacks - video report by Democracy Now!''

1960 births
American Muslims
American people convicted of murder
American people of Pakistani descent
Cadet College Hasan Abdal alumni
Criminals from Philadelphia
Drug Enforcement Administration informants
Islamic terrorism in the United States
Lashkar-e-Taiba members
Living people
American Islamists
Participants in the 2008 Mumbai attacks
People from Chicago
American people imprisoned on charges of terrorism
American expatriates in Pakistan
American expatriates in India
People convicted on terrorism charges

° https://economictimes.indiatimes.com/news/politics-and-nation/nia-team-in-chicago-to-question-headley-us-authorities-remain-mum/articleshow/6010473.cms?from=mdr

° https://indianexpress.com/article/news-archive/web/ilyas-kashmiri-had-plan-to-kill-lockheed-ceo-says-headley/

° https://www.hindustantimes.com/world/rana-s-wife-calls-india-second-home/story-o5KDurwhvcJJONvoxM3fKM.html